Calliostoma takujii is a species of sea snail, a marine gastropod mollusk in the family Calliostomatidae.

Some authors place this taxon in the subgenus Calliostoma (Fautor).

Description
The height of the shell attains 12 mm.

Distribution
This marine species occurs off Japan and the Philippines.

References

 Higo, S., Callomon, P. & Goto, Y. (1999). Catalogue and bibliography of the marine shell-bearing Mollusca of Japan. Osaka. : Elle Scientific Publications. 749 pp.

External links
 

takujii
Gastropods described in 1986